Willis "Gator" Jackson (April 25, 1928 – October 25, 1987) was an American jazz tenor saxophonist.

Biography
Born in Miami, Florida, and educated at the University of Miami, Jackson joined Cootie Williams's band in 1948 as a teenager, and was part of it on and off until 1955.

Under his own name (Willis Jackson and His Orchestra) he recorded various rhythm-and-blues instrumentals for Atlantic Records. His most famous record for Atlantic is "Gator's Groove" (1952), with "Estrellita" as the B-side.

Jackson toured as leader of the backing band for singer Ruth Brown. Publicly they were married, but privately they never married but lived together from 1950 to 1955. Jackson joined Prestige Records in 1959, making a string of albums.

Jackson died in New York City one week after heart surgery, in October 1987, at the age of 55.

Discography

As leader 
 Please Mr. Jackson (Prestige, 1959)
 Cool "Gator" (Prestige, 1959)
 Blue Gator (Prestige, 1960)
 Really Groovin' (Prestige, 1961)
 In My Solitude (Moodsville, 1961)
 Cookin' Sherry (Prestige, 1961)
 Thunderbird (Prestige, 1962)
 Bossa Nova Plus (Prestige, 1963)
 Neapolitan Nights (Prestige, 1963)
 Grease 'n' Gravy (Prestige, 1963)
 The Good Life (Prestige, 1963)
 Loose... (Prestige, 1963)
 Jackson's Action! (Prestige, 1964)
 Boss Shoutin' (Prestige, 1964)
 'Gator Tails (Verve, 1964)
 More Gravy (Prestige, 1964)
 Together Again! with Jack McDuff (Prestige, 1965)
 Smoking with Willis (Cadet, 1965)
 Live! Action (Prestige, 1966)
 Soul Night/Live! (Prestige, 1966)
 Together Again, Again with Jack McDuff (Prestige, 1967)
 Tell It... (Prestige, 1967)
 Soul Grabber (Prestige, 1968)
 Star Bag with Trudy Pitts, Bill Jennings (Prestige, 1968) 
 Swivelhips (Prestige, 1969)
 Gator's Groove (Prestige, 1969)
 Mellow Blues (UpFront, 1970)
 Recording Session (Big Chance, 1972)
 West Africa (Muse, 1974)
 Headed and Gutted (Muse, 1974)
 Funky Reggae (Trip, 1974)
 The Way We Were (Atlantic, 1975)
 Plays with Feeling (Cotillion, 1976)
 In the Alley (Muse, 1977)
 Bar Wars (Muse, 1978)
 The Gator Horn (Muse, 1979)
 Single Action with Pat Martino (Muse, 1980)
 Lockin' Horns with Von Freeman (Muse, 1981)
 Gatorade (Prestige, 1982)
 Nothing Butt... (Muse, 1983)
 Ya Understand Me? (Muse, 1984)

As sideman
 George Benson, Erotic Moods (Paul Winley, 1978)
 Bo Diddley, Big Bad Bo (Chess, 1974)
 Don McLean, Homeless Brother (United Artists, 1974)
 Johnny "Hammond" Smith , Johnny "Hammond" Cooks with Gator Tail (Prestige, 1962)

References

1932 births
1987 deaths
Soul-jazz saxophonists
Jump blues musicians
Hard bop saxophonists
American jazz saxophonists
American male saxophonists
Atlantic Records artists
Fire Records artists
Delmark Records artists
Prestige Records artists
Muse Records artists
Fantasy Records artists
20th-century American saxophonists
Musicians from Miami
20th-century American male musicians
American male jazz musicians
Black & Blue Records artists